Greystones A.F.C. were a football club from Greystones, Wicklow, Ireland.

History
The club played in the Leinster Senior League. They played their home games at Archfield in Greystones and had two teams; one that played in the Sunday Senior 1 division of the Leinster Senior League and the other in the Saturday Major 1 division of the Leinster Senior League.

Greystones reached the third round of the 2011 FAI Cup, where they played in front of a crowd of 600 against League of Ireland side Shelbourne at the Carlisle Grounds. Shelbourne won the match 3–1.

2015 saw the merger of Greystones AFC and town neighbours Greystones United A.F.C. The United name was kept and applied to the team competing in the top division of the Leinster Senior League.

Rivalries
Until the merger of the clubs in 2015, Greystones AFC had a rivalry with town neighbours Greystones United A.F.C.

References

Association football clubs in County Wicklow
Leinster Senior League (association football) clubs
Sport in Greystones